Arena Essex Raceway was a stock car and speedway racing track located near Purfleet, Essex. It opened in 1978 and closed in 2018. The Lakeside Shopping Centre was built close to the venue.

The stadium
The Arena-Essex Raceway Complex was the idea of local businessman and racing driver, Chick Woodroffe. It was built in the remains of an old cement works overspill site. The new circuit was a quarter-mile long with the first stock car race meeting held on 1 May 1978 which was infamously ruined by a heavy downpour.
The track originally had a post and wire fence, which caused some colossal crashes and wrecks in the banger formula, and caught a few of the hot rods out too.
In the late 80's the track swapped the post and wire for an Armco barrier and catch-fencing was installed to further protect spectators.

Every September, the track hosted the oldest National World Final Championship, which ran for over 40 years. If possible, just over 40 cars, plus qualifiers from the wild card race, competed in the world final event. Banger turnouts varied between 35 and 174 cars at the world final meetings. The winner from the previous year started the final in last place.

Sunday 4 November 2018 was the last meeting ever to be held at the raceway. It shut its gates for the last time after being offered £80 million for the site by housing developers. Demolition work on the stadium began in November 2020.

Banger Racing
Banger Racing took place on Sunday afternoons and Bank Holiday Mondays between the second week of March and the first week of November. There were different disciplines of bangers at Arena, such as Rookie Bangers, 2L Bangers, National Bangers, Team Bangers, Big Van Bangers, Caravan Destruction Derbies and Unlimited Bangers.

The oldest car raced at Arena Essex Raceway was a 1928 Dodge Standard Six which started at the back in Firecracker XIII 2004. It is said to be one of the oldest Bangers ever raced and after the meeting, was later sold to be used in a movie about damaged cars.

PRI Banger World Final Winners
The PRI National Banger World Final is the longest running world final in banger racing. It was first staged at Arena Essex Raceway in 1980, at the time it served alternate years with the Crayford stadium until 1984, at which point the Arena circuit became the sole venue for the event. In the early years, the race was dominated, as was much of the PRI banger scene, by cars from the BMC stable. 13 of the first 15 PRI world finals were won by a BMC vehicle, most often in the form of an Austin Cambridge or Morris Oxford. However, as the sport progressed it was the Ford manufacturer which became extremely dominant, indeed the following 33 world finals have been won by either a Cortina (1984), Granada (1985-2008) or Mondeo (2009-2018.) The first PRI world final was also won by a Ford in the shape of a Consul, whilst the only other winner has come in the form of an FSO 125p in 1982. Following the closure of Arena Essex in 2018, the title was transferred to Mendips Raceway, near Cheddar in Somerset. It was won by Ashley Garrod

Champions:

1971 Kevin McAuley
1972 John McGirr
1973 Peter Miles
1974 Peter Miles
1975 Brain Boulton
1976 Brain Boulton
1977 John Govier
1978 Bill Smith
1979 Terry Betts
1980 Tony Wise
1981 John Govier
1982 Dave Sanderson
1983 John King
1984 Trevor Jones
1985 Les Mapp
1986 Tony Wade
1987 Steve Taylor
1988 Dennis Whiteman
1989 Steve Taylor
1990 Kevin Wilsher
1991 Steve Taylor
1992 Gray Sheldon
1993 Chris Whiteman
1994 Vince Wolf
1995 Ian Cadman
1996 Mark Boulden
1997 Alan Trickett
1998 John Harris
1999 Phil Hudson
2000 Richard Ahern
2001 Andrew Davies
2002 Brett Ellacott
2003 Andrew Davies
2004 Wayne Cotterill
2005 Matt Fuller
2006 Billy King
2007 Paul Whiteman
2008 Carl Overy
2009 Matt Fuller
2010 Lee Hughes
2011 Lee Hughes
2012 Billy King
2013 Jason Jackson
2014 Scott Cornish
2015 Georgie Lee
2016 Jason Jackson
2017 Adam Hitchcock
2018 Dean Goodearl
2019 Ashley Garrod

Firecracker 
Firecracker was founded in 1991 and was by far one of, if not the most popular event at Arena Essex. Firecracker was a Banger racing only meeting; the main attraction to this event is the specific car rulings in place which outlaws more 'common' Bangers such as the Ford Granada. Originally, the meeting allowed all types of unlimited Bangers to race, but when the rule banning common cars was enforced, the meeting took off in popularity. The landmark ruling made it 'THE' meeting of the year where drivers could race their rare classics and bigger vehicles that were not suited to normal Banger events. At the conclusion of the meeting, there was also a firework display put on by the local 'Shellshock Fireworks' company.
 
In 2008, due to banger numbers falling, 1300cc Stock Cars were introduced as a support formula, however in 2010 Reliant Robins were swapped as the support formula, proving to be a popular move among fans. Stock Cars were re-introduced in the 2-Litre format from 2015 onward, due to a further drop in Banger and Robin numbers.

The final meeting in 2018 featured neither Reliant Robins or Stock Cars in support, as the stadium's closure boosted the Banger turnout above and beyond any meeting in the stadium's history.

Speedway
Speedway was introduced in 1984. They were founded (as the Arena-Essex Hammers) by promoter Wally Mawdsley and stock car promoter Chick Woodroffe. The team were nicknamed the Hammers after the West Ham Hammers team that closed twelve years earlier. The speedway team was renamed the Lakeside Hammers in 2007. 
The Hammers raced at the Arena Essex Raceway on most Friday evenings between March and October and competed in the SGB Championship, the second tier of Britain's speedway leagues. The Hammers were crowned Elite League Knockout Cup champions in 2009.

External links
 Archived copy of the Arena Essex Raceway site

References

Sports venues in Thurrock
Defunct motorsport venues in England
Defunct speedway venues in England
1978 establishments in England
2018 disestablishments in England